Dog years may refer to:

Biology
 Any of various measures used to describe a dog's age in human terms or vice versa: See .

Arts and entertainment
 Dog Years (1997 film), an American action-comedy directed by Robert Loomis
 Dog Years (2017 film), or The Last Movie Star, an American drama directed by Adam Rifkin
 Dog Years (novel), a 1963 novel by Günter Grass
 Dog Years (EP), a 2017 EP by the Winery Dogs
 Dog Years, a 2004 comedy album by Mike Birbiglia
 Dog Years, a 2021 album by the Night Game
 "Dog Years", a 1996 song by Rush from Test for Echo

See also
 Year of the dog (disambiguation)